Macrotrachelia nigronitens is a species of minute pirate bug, or flower bug.

Distribution
In New Zealand, the species is adventive.

References

Terrestrial biota of New Zealand